In Greek mythology, the name Europs may refer to:

Europs, son of the autochthon Aegialeus, father of Telchis and grandfather of Apis, all of whom formed a legacy of the primeval kings of Sicyon according to a local legend. He was said to be the second ruler of Aegialea and have reigned for 45 years.
Europs, son of Phoroneus whom Herophanes of Troezen wrote of as illegitimate; Pausanias concluded that Herophanes' account was plausible, since otherwise Phoroneus' kingdom would not have passed to Argus. Europs' own son Hermion was the presumed eponym of Hermione, Argolis.

Notes

References 
 Pausanias, Description of Greece with an English Translation by W.H.S. Jones, Litt.D., and H.A. Ormerod, M.A., in 4 Volumes. Cambridge, MA, Harvard University Press; London, William Heinemann Ltd. 1918. . Online version at the Perseus Digital Library
 Pausanias, Graeciae Descriptio. 3 vols. Leipzig, Teubner. 1903.  Greek text available at the Perseus Digital Library.

Princes in Greek mythology
Mythological kings of Sicyon
Kings in Greek mythology
Inachids
Sicyonian characters in Greek mythology
Mythology of Argolis